Parasquillidae is a family of mantis shrimp containing the three genera Faughnia, Parasquilla and Pseudosquillopsis. It was previously included in the superfamily Gonodactyloidea, but that group was found to be paraphyletic, and a new superfamily, Parasquilloidea was erected.

References

External links

Stomatopoda
Crustacean families
Taxa named by Raymond B. Manning